Jackson Heywood (born 20 July 1988) is an Australian actor. He played Brody Morgan on the Seven Network soap opera Home and Away from 2016–2019. 

On 3 June 2019 it was confirmed Heywood had chosen to leave Home and Away after three years and made his last appearance on 10 June 2019.

Early life
Heywood was born in Canberra, Australia. As the third of six children, he was raised in a coastal areas Newport and later Narrabeen in Sydney, where he relocated at an early age with his family as his mother, Christine, worked for ProKayaks, a canoe and kayak store in Narrabeen His older sister is actor, director and producer Millie Rose Heywood. He attended St Ives High School and following graduation in 2006, Heywood worked as a waiter and later a manager at cafe H2O in Dee Why, before he pursued as career in acting and enrolled at the National Institute of Dramatic Art (NIDA).

Career
Heywood graduated from the National Institute of Dramatic Art and went on to audition for roles in Australian television. In his debut, he was offered the four-month recurring role of Lachie Cladwell in the Seven Network soap opera Home and Away in 2008. His first appearance on the show was in May 2009, during the 22nd season, as the violent ex-boyfriend of character Claudia Hammond (Alexandra Park). In 2010, he appeared in the Australian feature film Vulnerable and two guest spots in the teen-oriented drama series Dance Academy, and the crime drama series East West 101, before relocating to Los Angeles to pursue an acting career in the United States. Following several auditions, Heywood landed a guest role in the MTV series Teen Wolf in 2014. His final work in the U.S. to date were the two short film projects The Answers and The Weight of Blood and Bones in 2015. After which, his Visa expired and he opted not to renew it, as his career in the U.S. had not been a success.

Upon his return to Australia, Heywood earned the role of Brody Morgan during the 29th season of Home and Away. Brody's family arrived in Summer Bay in mid-2016. He is the third of four children having an older brother, Justin (James Stewart), an older sister, Tori (Penny McNamee) and a younger brother, Mason (Orpheus Pledger). For the first few months after arriving in Summer Bay, Brody and his family concealed the fact that they had been living in witness protection for the past seven years and that his true name is Bartholomew Lee, following the shooting deaths of his parents who were part of a drugs syndicate. The family's secret was exposed in the lead-up to the 2016 season finale. Heywood said he expected the Morgans to be seen as the new Braxtons of the Bay, stating in an interview with TV Week, "I can definitely see that, but I think we have a very different dynamic." In May 2019, Daniel Kilkelly of Digital Spy reported that Heywood had not been seen filming on set. It was later confirmed that Brody would depart on 10 June 2019 as Heywood had chosen to leave the role after 3 years. 

In November 2019, it was announced that Heywood had been cast in Stan original television web series Bloom. He appeared in season 2, which released on 9 April 2020.

Personal life
Heywood was in a long-term relationship with American actress, Zelda Williams, daughter of Robin Williams. The pair began dating in November 2013 and they kept a low profile, eventually making their relationship public in May 2014 while they attended a Tiffany & Co. event at Chateau Marmont in Los Angeles. It is believed that they initially met on the set of Teen Wolf, while Heywood was residing in Los Angeles. In an interview with The Daily Telegraph in 2016, Heywood announced that the couple had split following their three-year relationship.

Filmography

References

External links
 
 
 

1988 births
Living people
People from Canberra
Australian male film actors
Australian male television actors